The Tejon Formation is a Paleogene period geologic formation in California.

Geology
The formation regionally overlies the Martinez Formation or the Chico Formation.  Paleontology in the Tejon Formation indicates a more tropical climate than during the Martinez Formation's period, with fauna that flourished in its littoral conditions.

Occurrences
It is predominantly found in the Fort Tejon area of the San Emigdio Mountains and Tehachapi Mountains in Kern County, and around Martinez in Contra Costa County.

Areas it surfaces, south to north, include:

Santa Ana Mountains
Santa Monica Mountains — near Calabasas.
Simi Hills — eastern section
Santa Susana Mountains — section in northwestern Simi Valley
Santa Clara River Valley — Rancho Camulos area
Topatopa Mountains — Sespe gorge area
Fort Tejon area of the San Emigdio Mountains and Tehachapi Mountains
San Joaquin Valley−Diablo Range — New Idria Mercury Mine  area
Mount Diablo — northern area
Martinez area on the Sacramento Delta
Clear Lake — Lower Lake area

Fossils
It preserves prehistoric plant and fauna fossils dating back to the Paleogene period of the Cenozoic Era.

Species 
Species (1897 taxa names) found only in the Tejon Formation include:

 Cardita horni
 Fusus sequileteralis
 Megistostigma striata
 Modiola ornata
 Morio tuberculatus
 Telina martinezensis
 Telina horni
 Thracia karquinezensis
 Turritella conica
 Turritella infragranulata
 Tritonium eocenicum

See also

 List of fossiliferous stratigraphic units in California
 
 Paleontology in California

References

Paleogene California
Geology of Kern County, California
Geology of Los Angeles County, California
Geology of Orange County, California
Geology of San Benito County, California
Geology of Ventura County, California
Geography of the San Joaquin Valley
Natural history of the Santa Monica Mountains
San Emigdio Mountains
Simi Hills
Tehachapi Mountains
Geologic formations of California